Veterinary Research is an international open access journal focusing on animal infectious diseases. Veterinary Research publishes original papers and reviews on host-pathogen interactions. Thematics are bacteriology, epidemiology, immunology, parasitology, prion diseases and virology.  

It was originally established as Annales de Recherches Vétérinaires (1970–1992), which itself superseded Recherches Vétérinaires (1968–1969). The journal acquired its current name in 1993.

The journal was initially published by the Institut National de la Recherche pour l’agriculture, l’alimentation et l’environnement  (INRAE), and later by Elsevier and EDP Sciences. It is now published by BMC and Springer. The journal is currently edited by Vincent Béringue.

Abstracting and indexing
The journal is abstracted and indexed in the following bibliographic databases:

References

External links

BioMed Central academic journals
Publications established in 1968
Bimonthly journals
Veterinary medicine in the United Kingdom
Veterinary medicine journals